James Robert Alexander Williams (born 20 July 1973) is a former Welsh cricketer.  Williams was a right-handed batsman and a right-arm off break bowler.  He was born at Neath, Glamorgan.  He was educated at Clifton College and Durham University.

Williams made a single first-class appearance for Glamorgan against the touring Australians in 1993, being dismissed in both innings by Merv Hughes.

In 1997, he played two Minor Counties Championship fixtures for Wales Minor Counties against Dorset and Berkshire.  He also represented the team in the 1998 MCCA Knockout Trophy against the Warwickshire Cricket Board.  He subsequently returned to Glamorgan, where he became the county's youth coach.

References

External links
James Williams at Cricinfo
James Williams at CricketArchive

1973 births
Living people
Cricketers from Neath
People educated at Clifton College
Alumni of Durham University
Welsh cricketers
Glamorgan cricketers
Wales National County cricketers
Welsh cricket coaches